Fehérvár Football Club is a professional Hungarian football club based in Székesfehérvár, Hungary.

Player

Most appearances

Top scorers

Record departures

Record arrivals

Most valuable arrivals

Team records

Nemzeti Bajnokság I
First Nemzeti Bajnokság I match:
First Magyar Kupa match:
Biggest win: Videoton 7–0 Szombathelyi Haladás (2014–15 Nemzeti Bajnokság I) (12 April 2015, Sóstói Stadion), Videoton 7–0 BFC Siófok (2011–12 Nemzeti Bajnokság I) (19 November 2011)
Heaviest defeats: Budapest Honvéd FC 5–1 Videoton (2007–08 Nemzeti Bajnokság I) (5 August 2005)

In Europe
Biggest win: Videoton 7–1  DAC Dunajska Streda (18 July 1993) (Intertoto Cup 1993)
Heaviest defeat:  1. FC Magdeburg 5–0 Videoton (24 November 1976) 1976–77 UEFA Cup

References

External links

records
Videoton